Arthur Butler may refer to:

 Art Butler (1887–1984), American baseball infielder
 Arthur Butler (bishop) (1912–1991), Irish clergyman
 Arthur Butler (historian) (1872–1949), Australian military historian and soldier
 Arthur Butler (rugby league) (1883–1947), Australian rugby league footballer
 Arthur Gardiner Butler (1844–1925), English entomologist
 Arthur Gray Butler (1831–1909), English academic and cleric
 Arthur H. Butler (1903–1972), Marine Corps Major general and Navy Cross recipient
 Arthur John Butler (1844–1910), English scholar
 Arthur Pierce Butler (1866–?), American teacher and educational administrator
 Arthur Butler, 4th Marquess of Ormonde (1849–1943)
 Arthur Butler, 6th Marquess of Ormonde (1893–1971)
 Artie Butler (born 1942), American popular music arranger

See also